The Barrier (translit. Barierata) is a 1979 Bulgarian drama film directed by Christo Christov. It was entered into the 11th Moscow International Film Festival where it won the Silver Prize. The film was selected as the Bulgarian entry for the Best Foreign Language Film at the 52nd Academy Awards, but was not accepted as a nominee.

Cast
 Innokentiy Smoktunovskiy as Antoni Manev
 Vania Tzvetkova as Doroteya
 Yevgeniya Barakova as Saprugata
 Maria Dimcheva as D-r Yurukova
 Ivan Kondov as Sledovatelyat
 Roumiania Parvanova as Mashtehata

See also
 List of submissions to the 52nd Academy Awards for Best Foreign Language Film
 List of Bulgarian submissions for the Academy Award for Best Foreign Language Film

References

External links
 

1979 films
1979 drama films
1970s Bulgarian-language films
 Barrier
Films directed by Christo Christov